Aminata is a 1988 play by Francis D. Imbuga. The main character, Aminata, is a female lawyer who cannot inherit her uncle Jumba's land. The play examines the role of women in African society.

References

Further reading 

1988 plays
Kenyan plays